William Pears Group is one of Britain's largest property companies, with £6 billion of property in London and south-east England.

The William Pears Group was founded in 1952, by Bernard Pears (who changed his name from Schleicher on emigrating from Austria) and his son Clive Pears. It is run by Mark Pears with his younger brothers Trevor and David.

According to The Daily Telegraph, Mark Pears is a director of 212 companies, a "complex labyrinth of operating and investment companies", but won't say which is the main holding company or what the group's annual profit is.

William Pears Group owns 3 – 4,000 London freehold residential properties, including large areas of Notting Hill.

In 2009, William Pears Group paid £750 million to Land Securities, to buy Telereal Trillium, a commercial property management and investment company.

In April 2013, William Pears Group bought The Spires Shopping Centre in Barnet, London, from the bank UBS for a reported £34 million. The Spires has since been bought by the Canadian investment fund AIMco.

Through Pears Global, they have "up to 6,200 apartments" in Berlin, managed through a series of "letterbox companies". In 2019, a collaboration of investigative journalists in Germany, headed by Correctiv, tracked down the ownership of about 25 companies with property in Berlin to six firms in Luxembourg, who belong to two firms on Cyprus, who belong to two firms on the British Virgin Islands, who the journalists concluded to be controlled by the William Pears Group.

The Pears brothers have invested in New York City as well, through the purchase of $147 million of at least 344 unsold condominium and cooperative units in mostly 1980s-era cooperatives and one rental building, according to PincusCo Media. The acquisitions began as early as 2011 and the most recent was in June 2020.

See also 

 Real estate companies in Germany

References

Real estate companies established in 1952
Property companies based in London
1952 establishments in England
Pears family